U.S. President Donald Trump created the Fake News Awards to highlight the news outlets that he said were responsible for misrepresenting him and/or producing false reports both before, and during, his presidency. A post to the blog of the Republican Party website announced the winners on January 17, 2018. They included reports ranging from comments by journalists on social media to news reports that later required corrections.

Creation
President Trump first proposed an award—then called the "Fake News Trophy"—in a November 2017 tweet:

It was unclear whether he intended to actually create the award at the time. Trump's re-election campaign sent emails to supporters with a link to an online poll asking them to rank three nominated stories as "fake", "faker", or "fakest" news in late December. Trump next mentioned the awards in a January 2, 2018 tweet. He called them the "Most Dishonest & Corrupt Media Awards of the Year", and wrote that he would award them for "dishonesty & bad reporting in various categories" at the time. The awards scheduled for January 8, 2018 at 5pm CST. Trump changed the date to January 17, citing increased interest in the award in a January 7 tweet.

Several late-night talk show hosts, including Samantha Bee and Jimmy Kimmel, satirically campaigned for an award. The Late Show with Stephen Colbert displayed a billboard doing such in New York City's Times Square, with categories including "Least Breitbarty" and "Corruptest Fakeness", and Trevor Noah's The Daily Show bought a full-page ad in The New York Times. The Tonight Show Starring Jimmy Fallon aired a sketch satirizing the Fake News Awards on January 16.

Awards
The ten stories awarded were from CNN (four times), The New York Times (twice), The Washington Post, ABC News, Newsweek and Time.
An eleventh bonus award went to reports about Russian interference in the 2016 United States elections that was generally called "perhaps the greatest hoax perpetrated on the American people".

Media pundits described the initial announcement of the winners as a flop since the Republican Party's website experienced technical difficulties and displayed a 404 error, along with a note that stated  "we're making it great again". A link to a working blog post supplied eventually.

The three stories on the online poll previously offered to Trump's supporters were ABC's reporting on Michael Flynn, CNN's reporting on Trump access to WikiLeaks documents, and Zeke Miller's erroneous report on the Martin Luther King Jr. bust.

Reception
Reaction to the "awards" was strong from different sources. Trump's supporters view the "awards" as a tongue-in-cheek approach highlighting media bias against the president, while critics view them as an attempt to undermine freedom of the press.

Some media commentators congratulated the "winners", and others mocked the awards on Twitter. The Daily Beast, BuzzFeed News and the Daily News sarcastically expressed disappointment that it did not win an award. The journalist Chris Riotta joked that he was "honored and humbled" to be included in the awards.

See also
 Ananias Club
 List of fake news websites
 Media bias in the United States

References

External links
 

2018 awards in the United States
American journalism awards
Donald Trump and social media
Fake news
Freedom of the press
Ironic and humorous awards
January 2018 events in the United States
Presidency of Donald Trump
Trump administration controversies
Awards established in 2017

fr:Bobards d'or#Aux États-Unis